In baseball, a grand slam is a home run that is hit when the bases are loaded (i.e., there are runners occupying first, second, and third base simultaneously), thereby scoring four runs—the most possible in one play.  Thirteen players have hit two grand slams in a single Major League Baseball (MLB) game to date, the most recent being Josh Willingham of the Washington Nationals on July 27, 2009. No player has accomplished the feat more than once in his career and no player has ever hit more than two in a game. Tony Lazzeri was the first player to hit two grand slams in a single game, doing so for the New York Yankees against the Philadelphia Athletics on May 24, 1936.

Every team which had a player hit two grand slams won their milestone games.  These games have resulted in other single-game MLB records being set due to the prodigious offensive performance. Lazzeri, for example, proceeded to hit a third home run in the game and finished with a total of eleven runs batted in, an American League record. Fernando Tatís became the only player to hit two grand slams in the same inning, when he attained the milestone, slugging two in the third inning for the St. Louis Cardinals on April 23, 1999.  In achieving the feat, he also set a new major league record with eight runs batted in in a single inning.

Tony Cloninger is the only pitcher to have accomplished the feat. Bill Mueller hit his grand slams from both sides of the plate, while Jim Northrup hit his grand slams on consecutive pitches received in the fifth and sixth innings. Nomar Garciaparra is the sole player to achieve the feat at home, doing so at Fenway Park for the Boston Red Sox.  Cloninger is the only player who never hit a grand slam before or after his milestone game, while Robin Ventura—with 18 grand slams—hit more than any other player in this group. Frank Robinson is also a member of the 500 home run club.

Of the nine players eligible for the Baseball Hall of Fame who have hit two grand slams in a game, two have been elected, one on the first ballot. Players are eligible for the Hall of Fame if they have played in at least 10 MLB seasons, and have either been retired for five seasons or deceased for at least six months. These requirements leave ineligible one player—Jim Tabor—who did not play in 10 seasons.

Players

References

General

Specific

Major League Baseball statistics